This is a list of newspapers in Niue. There is only one Niuean newspaper currently in circulation: the privately owned Niue Star. Tohi Tala Niue, a government publication, is no longer in circulation.

Niue Star
Tohi Tala Niue (defunct)

See also
List of newspapers

Niue
Newspapers
Newspapers